The Carolina, Cumberland Gap and Chicago Railway was a late 19th-century railroad that served the Southeastern United States.

Creation
The Carolina, Cumberland Gap and Chicago Railway was created in October 1882 when the French Broad and Atlantic Railway was consolidated with the Atlantic and French Broad Valley Railroad Company of North Carolina, the Morristown, Cumberland Gap and Ohio Railroad, the Morristown and Carolina Railroad, and the Cumberland Railway.

Opening
As of 1889, the line was still far from matching its ambitious name, stretching from Aiken, South Carolina, to Edgefield, South Carolina, a distance of about 25 miles.

Sale
In November 1891, a receiver was appointed for the Carolina, Cumberland Gap and Chicago Railway. 
The line was sold at foreclosure in October 1895, and the name changed to the Carolina and Cumberland Gap Railway. In 1898, the Carolina and Cumberland Gap was purchased by the Southern Railway.

See also

 Atlantic and French Broad Valley Railroad
 Belton, Williamston and Easley Railroad
 Carolina and Cumberland Gap Railway
 Edgefield Branch Railroad
 Edgefield, Trenton and Aiken Railroad
 French Broad and Atlantic Railway

References

External links
 Knoxville Daily Journal, 1 September 1891

Defunct South Carolina railroads
Railway companies established in 1882
Railway companies disestablished in 1895